The 1920–21 season was the 29th season of The Football League.

The Football League Third Division was introduced, in effect the Third Division South of the following season, when Third Division North was introduced. This expanded the League's operational radius all the way to the south coast of England, as the number of member clubs increased from 44 to 66.

Team changes
The new Third Division was formed by clubs of the Southern Football League Division One of the previous season, except for Cardiff City.  Cardiff City became the first Welsh club to enter the League, and since they were the strongest club in Wales in the era, they were invited directly into the Second Division. Grimsby Town took its place in the new Third Division, thereby being the first club relegated to the League's third tier. Leeds United were also elected into the Second Division to replace Leeds City after its debacle. Lincoln City were not re-elected to the Second Division and thus Port Vale's Second Division place was formalized as well.

Final league tables
The tables and results below are reproduced here in the exact form that they can be found at The Rec.Sport.Soccer Statistics Foundation website and in Rothmans Book of Football League Records 1888–89 to 1978–79, with home and away statistics separated.

Beginning with the season 1894–95, clubs finishing level on points were separated according to goal average (goals scored divided by goals conceded), or more properly put, goal ratio. In case one or more teams had the same goal difference, this system favoured those teams who had scored fewer goals. The goal average system was eventually scrapped beginning with the 1976–77 season. From the 1894–95 season and until the 1920–21 season the re-election process was required of the clubs which finished in the bottom three of the league.

First Division

Results

Maps

Second Division

Results

Maps

Third Division

Results

Maps

See also
1920–21 in English football
1920 in association football
1921 in association football

References

Ian Laschke: Rothmans Book of Football League Records 1888–89 to 1978–79. Macdonald and Jane’s, London & Sydney, 1980.

English Football League seasons